Enrique Nicanor (born 5 December 1944) is a film and TV producer/director, writer and designer best known for his works for public service broadcasting as Director of TVE-2, the Spanish Public TV and the creation of   and Perezgil, the Spanish muppets of Sesame Street (Barrio Sésamo). He began as a designer and film animation Director in Cuba (1959). Based in Paris (1965) and Spain (1967) he was board member and President of INPUT-TV, The International Public TV Conference and Film trainer at EAVE, The European Producers' workshop and the European Commission Learning Network. Independent producer since 1988.

Personal background 
The son of a Galician family of modest landowners, Nicanor's parents emigrated after the Spanish Civil war to New York joining their family there. In 1950 the family  established their home in Havana where he studied Fine Arts at The National School of Fine Arts Escuela Nacional de Bellas Artes "San Alejandro" and Philosophy and History of Arts at the University of Havana. In 1965 the family left Cuba and he went to Paris to work as animation director and cameraman with producer Serge Danot. In 1967, Mr. Adolfo Suárez, Director of the recently created Spanish Public TV (RTVE), invited E. Nicanor to come back to Spain and join the new institution where he produced and directed films and documentaries till 1983 becoming that year Director of the channel. In 1988 he left the Spanish institution to work internationally as an independent producer/consultor promoting public broadcasting service within institutions such as INPUT-TV, collaborating as professional film trainer at EAVE the European Audiovisual workshop and producing for international TV channels.

Early works in Cuba and France 

 1959, Cartoonist and designer for the Cuban newspaper Prensa Libre and the weekly magazine Bohemia at the time that Cuban Revolution took the political power.
 1960, Founder, Animator and Director of the Animation Department of ICAIC - Instituto Cubano de Arte e Industria Cinematográficos together with artists Jesús de Armas, Tulio Raggi, Eduardo Muñoz-Bachs, Modesto García, Hernán Henríquez, Harry Read, Jorge Carruana, Wichy R. Nogueras, Paco Prats and other pioneers who created the first Cuban animation films.
1965, Director, animator and cameraman with producer Serge Danot, co-producer Ivor Wood and scenographer Rafael Esteve for the Public French TV (ORTF) programme series The Magic Roundabout.

Filmography Cuba (ICAIC)

Filmography France, (ORTF) The French Public TV

Filmography Spain, RTVE, The Spanish Public TV 

 In 1967, Mr. Adolfo Suárez, Director of the recently created Spanish Public TV (RTVE), invited E. Nicanor to come back to Spain and join the new institution. He produced the Children series "The Adventures of Mumu the Bull", a new puppet animation series and started the channel production of documentaries, series and programmes in film format until 1983 when he became Channel director of TVE-2.

How it is How to do it, TV Series on crafts, arts and industry/ Cómo es Cómo se hace

The Rules of the Game, TV series on social anthropology

Barrio Sésamo, the Spanish co-production of Sesame Street

Noah Ark / El arca de Noé, series on wildlife and nature

1983, Head of the Children Programmes Unit at RTVE

1983-1987 Channel Director for TVE-2, the Cultural channel of RTVE

President of INPUT-TV, The International Public TV Conference 

 1987, Hosted and organised the INPUT-TV International Conference held in 1987-Granada, Spain.
 1995, Hosted and organised the INPUT-TV International Conference held in 1995-San Sebastian, Spain.
 1997, Elected President of INPUT-TV He held the Conferences of 1997-Nantes, France, 1998-Stuttgart, Germany, 1999-Fort Worth, USA, 2000-Halifax, Canada and 2001-Cape Town, South Africa.

European Institutions, EAVE and the MEDIA Programme 

 1987, Appointed Commissioner for European Audiovisual policies at the Spanish Ministry of Culture. He organised the "First European Year of Cinema" ceremony at Madrid under the presidency of Mme. Simone Veil and the King and Queen of Spain.
 Hosted the first international meeting of the Media Programme Initiative at the Barcelona Film Festival’87.
 1987, Joined the foundational group of EAVE, The European Audiovisual Training Programme together with European producers Raymond Ravar, Eckart Stein, Jacques Bidou, Luciano Gloor and Marcia Lerner, working as Group Leader and representing Spain as National Coordinator.  
 As EAVE National Coordinator he hosted the EAVE workshops:

 EAVE 1999-Madrid 
 EAVE 2001-Seville
 EAVE 2003- A Coruña
 EAVE 2005-Santiago de Compostela

 As Head of Studies he organised "EAVE Arc Atlantic" and "EAVE Alpes-Rhine" for European Regions together with EAVE expert and producer Jacqueline Pierreux:

 EAVE 1995 in Lisbon 
 EAVE 1996, in Besançon, Saarbrücken and Torino.
 EAVE 2005 La Coruña, Brest and Cardiff

Independent films and documentaries

Interviews within films and programmes

Awards and nominations 

 1982 Ondas award (Premio Ondas) for lifetime achievement in TV (Robinson)
 2005 Golden Medal of the Galician Audiovisual Academy (AGA) to lifetime achievement

References

External links 
 
 Tagore, Césaire, Neruda, for a Universal Humanism. Opening Ceremony speech by Irina Bukova. UNESCO (French/English version)
 Tagore, Césaire, Neruda por un nuevo humanismo/ (Spanish version) UNESCO
 The Magic Roundabout, episode narrated by Eric Thompson 
 The Rules of the Game, Language, episode remix 2017: 
 The Southern Whale, remix 2017: 
 Planet Mars in the Earth, Rio Tinto 
 Federico García Lorca, Family portrait, remix 2018 

1944 births
Living people
Spanish cartoonists
Spanish documentary film directors
RTVE